Bamber Bridge is a large village in Lancashire, England,  south-east of Preston, in the borough of South Ribble. The name derives from the Old English "bēam" and "brycg", which probably means "tree-trunk bridge". The population was 13,945 at the 2011 census.

History

Textiles
By 1764 calico printing had been established in what was then a village; this was the first example of calico printing anywhere in Lancashire. Previously had been mainly carried out in the south of England, before spreading to Scotland and the northern counties.

In 1857, as a result of the downturn in the cotton trade, a large manufacturer and spinner in the village (Bamber Bridge SP & WN Co.) reported liabilities estimated at £40,000 to £60,000, and were about to go on short time.

On 31 October 1859, the Withy Trees Mill in the village, owned by Eccles and Company, burnt down. It was reported that the spinning-master and engineer had stayed on after the mill had closed at 6:00 pm to repair some machinery on the third floor. A spark from a lamp is said to have dropped on some cotton waste, igniting it. Nobody was killed or injured, but between 16,000 and 17,000 spindles and 270 looms were destroyed and 250 people lost their jobs.

On 7 June 1862, The Times stated that 600 hands had been thrown out of work with the stoppage of Dewhurst's Mill. The same report described the economic problems of the village: 1 in 5 people in Bamber Bridge and Walton-le-Dale and the surrounding area were now reduced to pauperism.

A petition against the recognition of the Confederate States of America was presented to the House of Commons on Monday, 29 June 1863, by a villager, a Mr Barnes. No mention is made of his first name or whether he represented any organisation.

The trade unionist George Woodcock was born in Bamber Bridge on 20 October 1904. He was a voluntary official of the Bamber Bridge branch of the Weavers' Association after a spell of tuberculosis. He won a TUC scholarship to Ruskin College, Oxford in 1929. He was awarded the CBE in 1953 and appointed a member of the Privy Council in 1957. He was General Secretary of the TUC in 1960 and a member of the Royal Commission on Trade Unions and Employers' Associations in 1965 and served as chairman from 1969 to 1971. He died on 30 October 1979.

Second World War

During the Second World War, Bamber Bridge was home to the 1511 Quartermaster Truck regiment. The unit was racially segregated, and all of the soldiers except the officers were African American. Tensions in the wake of the 1943 Detroit race riot caused a major fight, known as the Battle of Bamber Bridge to break out between white American military police on one side, and black American soldiers and townsfolk on the other. A Black American soldier, Private William Crossland, was killed. In June 2022, a memorial garden commemorating the battle was created opposite the pub where the Battle of Bamber Bridge started. The incident inspired the plot of the film The Railway Children Return.

Transport

Railways
The first railway through Bamber Bridge was the horsedrawn Lancaster Canal Tramroad, which connected two parts of the Lancaster Canal, and crossed Station Road.

The steam-hauled railway came to Bamber Bridge around the same time as the first cotton mills. A line was built connecting Blackburn with the West Coast Main Line at Farington, with a branch connecting Bamber Bridge directly to Preston. A station was built where the railway crossed Station Road at a level crossing.

The stretch of track through the village was first owned by the East Lancashire Railway, then the Lancashire and Yorkshire Railway following incorporation in 1847.

In March 1859, a Hurricane engine bolted off the rails at Bamber Bridge, ran across the level crossings and caught the end of a house, knocking down the gable end. The accident did not end with any death or injury, even though a woman was washing in the kitchen of the house.

The railway was then amalgamated into the London and North Western Railway in 1922, and twelve months later became part of the London, Midland and Scottish Railway (LMS). The LMS plaque was still in existence on the station subway buildings before their demolition in 2005 due to dilapidation. The railways were nationalised in 1948, becoming part of British Railways (later rebranded as British Rail). The railways were privatised in 1994 by the Conservative government.

The line from Farington to Blackburn is now part of the East Lancashire Line.

The direct route to Preston was closed by British Rail in the 1970s, and most of the route is now a cycle route, forming part of the National Cycle Network.

Roads
Station Road is the main road through Bamber Bridge, and most of the shops are on this road. It crosses the railway at a level crossing next to the railway station. It was formerly part of the A6, until a bypass was built in the 1980s.

The village is also at the northern end of the A49, where it meets the A6.

The section of the M6 motorway around the village is part of the Preston Bypass opened in 1958, the first motorway in Britain, and includes the junction with the M61 from Manchester. More recently the M65 has been extended to join the A6, also in Bamber Bridge.

Public transport
Bamber Bridge railway station has hourly direct trains to Preston, Blackburn, Accrington and Burnley and various railway stations in between. There are also Sunday direct services to Lytham St Annes and Blackpool South but these require a change at Preston on other days. Trains to Bradford and Leeds that pass through the unmanned station normally require a change at either Blackburn or Preston. On Sundays between April and October, the "Dalesrail" service operates from Blackpool North to Carlisle via Blackburn, Clitheroe and the Settle–Carlisle Line, calling at Bamber Bridge.

The Stagecoach Merseyside & South Lancashire 125 bus route from Preston runs through Bamber Bridge en route to Chorley and Bolton. Transdev's 153 service between Preston and Leyland links Bamber Bridge with Gregson Lane and Lostock Hall. The Lancashire County Council tendered 112 service from Preston to Croston, currently operated by Holmeswood Coaches, also operates through the village.

Politics

Local
Bamber Bridge is an unparished area within South Ribble District. Following boundary reforms in 2015 it has been split between two wards on the borough council, both of which are represented by two councillors. Bamber Bridge West is currently represented by Paul Foster and Caleb Tomlinson. Bamber Bridge East is represented by Christine Melia and John Michael Higgins. All four borough councillors are members of the Labour Party.

County
Bamber Bridge is covered by two electoral divisions on Lancashire County Council. The second, South Ribble East, covers part of the south and east of Bamber Bridge and is represented by Barrie Yates. Both county councillors are members of the Conservative Party.

Parliamentary
Following their review of parliamentary representation in Lancashire, the Boundary Commission for England created a modified Ribble Valley seat and the three Bamber Bridge electoral wards at that time - Bamber Bridge East, Bamber Bridge North and Bamber Bridge West - moved into this constituency at the 2010 UK general election. This means that Bamber Bridge is currently represented in the House of Commons by Nigel Evans, the Conservative Party MP for Ribble Valley. The wards were transferred despite objections raised by the Labour Party in Bamber Bridge. Prior to the 2010 UK general election, the three Bamber Bridge electoral wards were in the Preston parliamentary constituency and were represented by Mark Hendrick MP.

Boundary changes proposed by the Boundary Commission for England as part of Sixth Periodic Review of Westminster constituencies would see both the current Bamber Bridge East and Bamber Bridge West wards move into a revised South Ribble seat at the next general election. The recommendations were submitted to the Government on 5 September 2018 and it's now up to Parliament to decide whether the boundary changes will be implemented.

Demographics
Population. The 2001 Census data for the three wards that make up Bamber Bridge listed the entire population as 12,126. Of this number, 5,882 are listed as male and 6,244 as female.

Age. The population was divided into the following age groups; 0–4 years, 5.86%; 5–15 years, 14.64%; 16–19 years, 4.19%; 20–44 years, 34.34%; 45–64 years, 25.21%, and; over 65 years, 15.75%.

Ethnicity. According to census returns, the ethnic make-up of the village was; White, 98.10%; Mixed, 0.50%; Asian or Asian British, 0.66%; Black, Black British, 0.23%, and; Chinese or other ethnic group, 0.51%.

Religion. The percentage of people listing themselves as; Christian, 86.68%; Buddhist, 0.10%; Hindu, 0.32%; Jewish, 0.00%; Muslim, 0.21%; Sikh, 0.11%; Other religions, 0.07%; No religion, 7.91%, and; Religion not stated, 4.60%.

Housing. In 2001, there were a total of 5,027 households in the three wards. Of the total 84.14% were owner occupied and 15.86% were rented. Expressed as a percentage of the total; 34.50% owned their property outright; 48.47% owned their property with a mortgage or a loan, and; 1.16% of householders had shared ownership of their property. Expressed as a percentage of the total; 0.86% rented their home from the local authority; 10.22% rented from a housing association; 3.05% rented from a private landlord or a letting agency, and; 1.73% rented from another source.

Health. In 2001; 67.28% of people were listed as 'in good health'; 22.89% in fairly good health; 9.83% not in good health, and; 19.74% of people were listed with a limiting long-term illness.

Worship
Bamber Bridge has two Anglican churches, both are parish churches in the Diocese of Blackburn.  The first to be built was St.Saviour's Church, on Church Road at the south end of the village, was built in 1837 on land given by Mr. R. Townley Parker (Guild mayor of Preston in 1862) and was considerably altered and enlarged in 1886/87, when the altered church was opened by Lord Cranbourne. The land for the churchyard was donated by Mr. R. A. Tatton of Cuerden Hall.  It is a Grade II listed building. St. Aidan's Church, on Station Road, was founded in 1895.

The village's Roman Catholic church, St. Mary's Church, is on Brownedge Lane, and was built in 1826, as a replacement for a chapel. A spire was added in 1866, and the church was partly rebuilt by Peter Paul Pugin in 1892. The church has a neo-gothic altar. Bamber Bridge is in the Diocese of Salford.

Bamber Bridge Methodist Church is on the corner of Wesley Street and Station Road, and was opened in 2006, as a replacement for an older building on the same site.

Bamber Bridge is also home to Valley Church which meets in Fourfields House on Station Road. The church was planted in 2007 by Pastors Ed and Michele Carter. Valley Church is a church plant from Fulwood Free Methodist Church and originally met in Walton-le-Dale Arts College and High School before outgrowing the facilities there and moving to Fourfields House in 2011.

Notable people
Kevin Brown (born 1950), an English blues musician was born in Bamber Bridge.

See also

Listed buildings in Walton-le-Dale

References

External links
 

Villages in Lancashire
Geography of South Ribble